The Taiping Yulan, translated as the Imperial Reader or Readings of the Taiping Era, is a massive Chinese leishu encyclopedia compiled by a team of scholars from 977 to 983. It was commissioned by the imperial court of the Song dynasty during the first era of the reign of Emperor Taizong. It is divided into 1,000 volumes and 55 sections, which consisted of about 4.7 million Chinese characters. It included citations from about 2,579 different kinds of documents spanning from books, poetry, odes, proverbs, steles to miscellaneous works. After its completion, the Emperor Taizong is said to have finished reading it within a year, going through 3 volumes per day. It is considered one of the Four Great Books of Song.

The team who compiled the Taiping Yulan includes: Tang Yue (湯悅), Zhang Wei (張洎), Xu Xuan (徐鉉), Song Bai (宋白), Xu Yongbin (徐用賓), Chen E (陳鄂), Wu Shu (吳淑), Shu Ya (舒雅), Lü Wenzhong (吕文仲), Ruan Sidao (阮思道), Hu Meng (扈蒙), Li Fang (李昉), and others.

It is one of the sources used by Ming and Qing scholars to reconstruct the lost Record of the Seasons of Jingchu.

Significant Manuscripts 
One such copy of the Taiping Yulan is held at Tōfuku-ji in Kyoto, Japan. In 1244, Enni was approved by the Song government to bring back 103 volumes of the encyclopedia, and later on, an additional 10 volumes were brought in for circulation amongst Japanese monks. The 103 volumes are now classified as a National Treasure.

References

Citations

Bibliography

 in Florence Bretelle-Establet and Karine Chemla (eds.), Qu'est-ce qu'écrire une encyclopédie en Chine?. Extreme Orient-Extreme Occident Hors série (2007), 39–76.
 Endymion Wilkinson. Chinese History: A New Manual. (Cambridge, MA: Harvard University Asia Center, Harvard-Yenching Institute Monograph Series,  2012), pp. 651–652.

Chinese prose texts
Chinese encyclopedias
Chinese literature
10th-century Chinese books
Song dynasty literature
Diplomatics
Leishu
983
10th century in China